Isaiah Sykes (born December 2, 1991) is an American professional basketball player who is currently a free agent. He played college basketball for the UCF Knights men's basketball team where he was named to the 2013 Conference USA First Team. He scored a career-high 36 points in a double overtime victory over Temple in the opening round of the 2014 AAC tournament.

High school career 
Sykes played high school basketball representing Edwin C. Denby High School (Detroit, Michigan). Playing for head coach Chuck Albright, Sykes averaged 19.7 points, 5.9 rebounds and 4.3 assists throughout his senior year. After leading the school to the Michigan Class A state semi-finals, he was selected to play in the Michigan High School All-Star Game in which he scored 17 points. Soon after he graduated from Denby, Sykes played for the Amateur Athletic Union (AAU) team known as the Michigan Hurricanes, under coach Will Smith. He then went on to participate in the 2009 Reebok All-American Camp, earning all-star honors.

College career 
Sykes chose to attend the University of Central Florida after also considering the schools: Arkansas, Memphis, Michigan, and Tennessee. In his freshman year, he seemed to have little effect on the success of the program, led by Marcus Jordan and Keith Clanton. By the end of his first season, Sykes averaged 4.0 points and 3.3 rebounds per game. He logged a season-high 12 points against Furman on December 29, 2010.

|}
By the end of Sykes's sophomore year, he had made 32 of 33 possible starts in the Knights' regular season schedule. He scored at least 20 points in six of these games and also emerged as a huge rebounder, recording six double-doubles. He was also named the 2012 UCF Holiday Classic MVP.

Shortly before he entered his senior year, Sykes considered entering the NBA draft but withdrew his name. On February 9, 2013, against East Carolina, Sykes became the NCAA Division I's second player to record multiple triple-doubles in a single season. Becoming one of the Conference USA's premier scorers, rebounders, and shot-blockers, he was named to the conference's All-Defensive Team and All-Conference First Team.

After an exceptionally successful junior year in college basketball, Isaiah Sykes was named to the American Athletic Conference All-League Preseason Second Team. During his senior season he averaged 17.2 points per game and scored a career-high 36 points in a victory over the Temple Owls on March 12, 2014. The record initiated a win in the opening round of the 2014 American Athletic Conference men's basketball tournament.

College statistics

|-
| style="text-align:left;"| 2010–11
| style="text-align:left;"| UCF
| 32 || 1 || 16.4 || .563 || .000 || .475 || 3.2 || .8 || .8 || .0 || 4.0
|-
| style="text-align:left;"| 2011–12
| style="text-align:left;"| UCF
| 33 || 32 || 30.7 || .545 || .286 || .546 || 6.4 || 2.0 || 1.1 || .4 || 12.3
|-
| style="text-align:left;"| 2012–13
| style="text-align:left;"| UCF
| 31 || 31 || 34.8 || .457 || .320 || .617 || 7.5 || 4.5 || 2.3 || .5 || 16.0
|-
| style="text-align:left;"| 2013–14
| style="text-align:left;"| UCF
| 30 || 30 || 31.9 || .475 || .375 || .540 || 7.2 || 3.5 || 1.7 || .2 || 17.2

Professional career 
After going undrafted in the 2014 NBA draft, Sykes joined the Philadelphia 76ers for the 2014 NBA Summer League. On August 11, 2014, he signed with Basket Recanati of the Serie A2 Gold Basket.

References

External links 
UCF bio
RealGM profile
Sports-Reference.com Profile

1991 births
Living people
American expatriate basketball people in Israel
American expatriate basketball people in Italy
American men's basketball players
Basketball players from Detroit
Maccabi Hod HaSharon players
Shooting guards
Small forwards
UCF Knights men's basketball players